Elizabeth Christensen (born 1978) is an American writer and author of novels based on the Stargate Atlantis television series, often collaborating with Sonny Whitelaw (See also Stargate literature). A fan of aviation, she holds degrees in aerospace engineering from the University of Michigan as well as being a certificated private pilot.

Publications 
Novels
 Stargate Atlantis: The Chosen, April 2006, co-authored with Sonny Whitelaw 
 Stargate Atlantis: Exogenesis, December 2006, co-authored with Sonny Whitelaw
 Stargate Atlantis: Casualties of War, Fall 2007
 Stargate Atlantis: Blood Ties, Winter 2007, co-authored with Sonny Whitelaw

Short stories
 Course Corrections, a short story published in Stargate:The Official Magazine, issue #15.

External links 

1978 births
21st-century American novelists
University of Michigan College of Engineering alumni
Living people
American women novelists
21st-century American women writers